Anna Blinkova and Alla Kudryavtseva were the defending champions, but both players chose to participate in different tournaments. Blinkova chose to participate at Mallorca, while Kudryavtseva chose to compete at Birmingham.

Asia Muhammad and Maria Sanchez won the title, defeating Natela Dzalamidze and Galina Voskoboeva in the final, 4–6, 6–3, [10–1].

Seeds

Draw

Draw

References
Main Draw

Fuzion 100 Ilkley Trophy - Doubles